Hotel Central (Bulgarian: Хотел Централ, also known as The Central Hotel) is a 1983 Bulgarian film written and directed by Veselin Branev. It was entered into the main competition at the 40th edition of the Venice Film Festival to large critical acclaim.

Plot 
Set on the eve of the 1934 coup d'état, the film tells the parallel stories of the chambermaid Tinka, who is forced to prostitution, and of a stage company led by Tinka's idol.

Cast 

 Iren Krivoshieva as Tinka
  as  Aptekaryat Yonchev
 Valentin Gadzhokov as Stefo
 Boryana Puncheva as Lencheto
 Anton Radichev as  Stavri
 Stoyan Stoev as  Benyo

References

External links
 
 

1983 films
Bulgarian drama films
1983 drama films
Films based on short fiction
Films set in 1934